The Silvretta Alps are a mountain range of the Central Eastern Alps shared by Tirol, Vorarlberg (both in Austria) and Graubünden (Switzerland). The Austrian states of Tirol and Vorarlberg are connected by a pass road (Silvretta Hochalpenstraße at 2032 m). The majority of the peaks are elevated above three thousand metres and are surrounded by glaciers. Thus, the area is also known as the "Blue Silvretta".

Borders

According to the Alpine Clubs, the Silvretta Alps are outlined from other groups by the following borders:
St. Gallenkirch - Ill river as far as Partenen - Zeinisjoch - Zeinisbach - Paznauntal as far as Ischgl - Fimbertal - Fimber Pass - Val Chöglias - Val Sinestra - Inn River from the mouth of the Branclabach to the mouth of the Susasca - Val Susasca - Flüela Pass - Davos - Wolfgang - Laretbach - Klosters - Schlappinbach - Schlappiner Joch - Valzifensbach - Gargellental - St. Gallenkirch.

The Silvretta Alps are surrounded by the Rätikon, Verwall, Samnaun, Sesvenna, Albula and Plessur ranges.

The Piz Buin is not the highest, but the most popular peak of the range. It can relatively easily be ascended from north or south through glaciers and stretches of easy climbing.

The Silvretta is famous for its skiing especially its many backcountry skiing possibilities. In the 1920s Ernest Hemingway was staying in the region for a winter (he lived at Schruns in Montafon, Austria). Later, he wrote a couple of short stories about his skiing experiences in the Silvretta. Some of these short stories are to be found in A moveable feast.

Adjacent valleys
Montafon
Paznaun
Engadin

Peaks

Mountain huts
 Berghaus-Verein, private
 Bodenalpenhaus, private 
 Chamanna Dal Linard, Swiss Alpine Club (SAC) 
 Fergen Hut, SAC 
 Heidelberger Hut, German Alpine Club (DAV), Heidelberg Section
 Jamtal Hut DAV, Schwaben Section
 Klostertaler Umwelt Hut, DAV 
 Madlenerhaus, DAV Wiesbaden Section
 Saarbrücken Hut, DAV, Alpenverein u. Skiclub Silvretta 
 Seetal Hut, SAC
 Silvretta Hut, SAC 
 Tuoi Hut, SAC 
 Tübingen Hut, DAV, Tübingen Section
 Wiesbaden Hut, DAV Wiesbaden Section

Ski areas in the Silvretta Alps 

 Silvretta Montafon –  Vorarlberg, Austria – largest ski area offering 113 km of slopes
 Silvretta Bielerhöhe – Partenen –  Vorarlberg, Austria
 Gargellen –  Vorarlberg, Austria
 Galtür – Silvapark –  Tyrol, Austria
 Scuol (Motta Naluns) –  Graubünden, Switzerland
 Parsenn (Davos Klosters) –  Graubünden, Switzerland – highest ski area which extends up to an altitude of 2,844m
 Madrisa (Davos Klosters) –  Graubünden, Switzerland
 Pischa (Davos Klosters) –  Graubünden, Switzerland
 Selfranga – Klosters –  Graubünden, Switzerland
 Ardez –  Graubünden, Switzerland
 Guarda –  Graubünden, Switzerland

See also
Passes of the Silvretta and Rätikon Ranges
Swiss Alps

References

 
Mountain ranges of the Alps
Rhaetian Alps
Mountain ranges of Tyrol (state)
Mountain ranges of Switzerland
Austria–Switzerland border